Empress Zhen (died 22 August 251), personal name unknown, formally known as Empress Huai (懷皇后), was an empress of the state of Cao Wei during the Three Kingdoms period of China. She was the first wife of Cao Fang, the third emperor of Cao Wei.

Not much is known about her, other than that her grandfather, Zhen Yan (甄儼), was a brother of Lady Zhen, the mother of Cao Rui (the second emperor of Wei). Cao Fang created her empress in 243. She died in 251 and was buried with honours befitting an empress. (The reason her posthumous name was one character rather than two was because her husband was eventually deposed in 254, and therefore never given a posthumous name; the customs at the time generally dictated that the empress' posthumous name share one character with their husbands'.)

See also
 Cao Wei family trees#Cao Fang
 Lists of people of the Three Kingdoms

Notes

References

 Chen, Shou (3rd century). Records of the Three Kingdoms (Sanguozhi).
 Sima, Guang (1084). Zizhi Tongjian.

251 deaths
Cao Wei empresses
Year of birth unknown